Eurhodope incensella is a species of snout moth in the genus Eurhodope. It was described by Staudinger in 1859. It is found in Spain and North Africa.

References

Moths described in 1859
Phycitini